Ernest "Bung" Newling (26 June 1876 – 30 November 1944) was an Australian rules footballer who played with Geelong in the Victorian Football League (VFL).

Newling, who was blind in one eye, played as a defender and follower. He arrived to the club from Geelong West.

He was just the third Geelong player to appear in 150 league games, after Teddy Rankin and Henry Young. Despite his disability with the use of one eye, he managed to make 148 with Geelong B side against Belmont in a 1901/02 Geelong Cricket Association First Eleven Match.

He is buried at the East Geelong Cemetery Humble Street side.

References

1876 births
1944 deaths
Australian rules footballers from Victoria (Australia)
Australian Rules footballers: place kick exponents
Geelong West Football Club players
Geelong Football Club players